Andrei Golban (born 17 March 1974) is a Moldovan judoka. He competed in the men's lightweight event at the 1996 Summer Olympics.

Achievements

References

External links

1974 births
Living people
Moldovan male judoka
Olympic judoka of Moldova
Judoka at the 1996 Summer Olympics
20th-century Moldovan people